The 2010 Copa Chevrolet season was the first Copa Chevrolet Montana season. The category  is the second tier of Stock Car Brasil replaces Copa Vicar. It began on April 11 at Curitiba and ended on December 5 at same circuit after nine rounds.

Driving for Nascar Motorsport, Diogo Pachenki claimed the title after win the last round at Curitiba.

Teams and drivers
 All cars are powered by Chevrolet engines and use Chevrolet Montana chassis. All drivers were Brazilian-registered.

Race calendar and results
All rounds of the championship will support the Stock Car Brasil events. All races were held in Brazil.

Championship standings
Points were awarded as follows:

Drivers' Championship

External links
 Official website of the Stock Car Brasil (In Portuguese)

Copa Chevrolet Montana
Stock Car Brasil